William James McAdam (7 January 1882 – 28 June 1967) was an Australian politician.

Born in Emerald Hill to blacksmith Alexander McAdam and Mary Ann Vigar, he attended state schools in Ballarat before becoming a bread carter. He became an organiser of the Bread Carters Union in 1904, rising to become secretary in 1924. On 21 February 1905 he married Sarah Robin, with whom he had four daughters. He became an organiser with the Ballarat Municipal Employees section of the Shop Assistants and Textile Workers Union in 1916, and federal secretary of the union from 1917 to 1924. From 1920 to 1924 he was president of the Ballarat Trades and Labour Council (he would hold the position again from 1947 to 1956). In 1924 he was elected to the Victorian Legislative Assembly as the Labor member for Ballarat East; he transferred to Ballarat in 1927, and was defeated in 1932. He made unsuccessful attempts to return to politics via a by-election for Allandale in 1933, Ballarat in 1935, and the Senate in 1940. McAdam died at Ballarat in 1967 and is buried in Ballaarat Old Cemetery.

References

1882 births
1967 deaths
Members of the Victorian Legislative Assembly
People from Ballarat
Australian Labor Party members of the Parliament of Victoria
20th-century Australian politicians